The 2009 Carlton Rugby 7s, had previously been conducted as the Singer Sri Lankan Airlines Rugby 7s competition but was rebranded as the Carlton Sri Lanka Rugby 7s under a new partnership between the Tharunyata Hetak Foundation and the Sri Lanka Rugby Football Union (SLRFU). The tournament was the sixth and final leg of the Asian Sevens Series for the year.

The Carlton 7s were held on 27–29 November 2008 at Sugathadasa Stadium in Colombo, involving 12 teams from the Asian rugby playing nations of Japan, South Korea, Kazakhstan, Chinese Taipei, China, Thailand, Iran, Jordan, Brunei, Pakistan and Malaysia, together with the host nation, Sri Lanka. In the Cup final Japan defeated Malaysia 26 points to 7, with Thailand winning the Plate and Pakistan the Bowl.

There was also a separate championship for six invited international teams, in addition to the annual schools tournament. The schools event was won by St Peter’s College, who defeated Royal College 17 points to 14. In the final of the Invitational International tournament, Fiji, who fielded the Fiji Dijicel were victorious over the South African Vipers, 38 points to 12. In the third place play-off the Western Samoa Barbarians beat the New Zealand Legends by 14-5 whilst the Australian Legends recorded a 24-5 win over Papua New Guinea in the fifth place play-off.

First round

Pool A

 40 - 00 
 15 - 7 
 33 - 00 

{| class="wikitable" style="text-align: center;"
|-
!width="200"|Teams
!width="40"|Pld
!width="40"|W
!width="40"|D
!width="40"|L
!width="40"|PF
!width="40"|PA
!width="40"|+/−
!width="40"|Pts
|-style="background:#ccffcc"
|align=left| 
|2||2||0||0||73||0||+73||6
|-style="background:#ccffcc"
|align=left| 
|2||1||0||1||15||47||-32||4
|-style="background:#fcc6bd"
|align=left| 
|2||0||0||2||7||48||-41||2
|}

Pool B

 31 - 14 
 45 - 00 
 31 - 00 

{| class="wikitable" style="text-align: center;"
|-
!width="200"|Teams
!width="40"|Pld
!width="40"|W
!width="40"|D
!width="40"|L
!width="40"|PF
!width="40"|PA
!width="40"|+/−
!width="40"|Pts
|-style="background:#ccffcc"
|align=left|  
|2||2||0||0||62||14||+48||6
|-style="background:#ccffcc"
|align=left| 
|2||1||0||1||59||31||+28||4
|-style="background:#fcc6bd"
|align=left| 
|2||0||0||2||0||76||−76||2
|}

Pool C

 35 - 05 
 43 - 00 
  41 - 00 

{| class="wikitable" style="text-align: center;"
|-
!width="200"|Teams
!width="40"|Pld
!width="40"|W
!width="40"|D
!width="40"|L
!width="40"|PF
!width="40"|PA
!width="40"|+/−
!width="40"|Pts
|-style="background:#ccffcc"
|align=left|  
|2||2||0||0||78||5||+73||6
|-style="background:#ccffcc"
|align=left| 
|2||1||0||1||46||35||+11||4
|-style="background:#fcc6bd"
|align=left| 
|2||0||0||2||0||84||−84||3
|}

Pool D

 22 - 12 
 52 - 00 
 24 - 00 

{| class="wikitable" style="text-align: center;"
|-
!width="200"|Teams
!width="40"|Pld
!width="40"|W
!width="40"|D
!width="40"|L
!width="40"|PF
!width="40"|PA
!width="40"|+/−
!width="40"|Pts
|-style="background:#ccffcc"
|align=left| 
|2||2||0||0||74||12||+62||6
|-style="background:#ccffcc"
|align=left| 
|2||1||0||1||36||22||+14||4
|-style="background:#fcc6bd"
|align=left| 
|2||0||0||2||0||76||-76||2
|}

Second round

Bowl

Plate

Cup

References

2009
2009 rugby sevens competitions
2009 in Asian rugby union
rugby sevens